Don Matheson (August 5, 1929 – June 29, 2014) was an American soldier and policeman who later became a television actor, perhaps best known for his continuing role in Irwin Allen's series Land of the Giants.

Career
Prior to entering acting, Matheson served in the military. While serving in Korea, he was awarded the Bronze Star for valorous leadership and a Purple Heart for injuries suffered in an explosion.

After serving in the military for six years, he joined the Detroit Police Department. He then left law enforcement to begin a career in acting. In 1965 Matheson appeared in the Lost in Space episode, "The Sky Is Falling" in the non-speaking role of the alien Retho and then again in 1967 as IDAK Alpha 12 in the episode "Revolt of the Androids". The same year, he appeared as a guest star in the episode "Deadly Amphibians" on the sci-fi TV show's 4th season Voyage to the Bottom of the Sea.

After working in a number of plays, television episodes and commercials, Matheson was signed to join the cast of the Land of the Giants. In 1976, he played the role of wealthy industrialist, Cameron Faulker, who married Lesley Williams (Denise Alexander) on General Hospital. In 1984, Matheson had a regular role in Falcon Crest. He played Richard Channing's henchman for a season. He also appeared briefly in Dynasty.

Personal life
Matheson married co-star Deanna Lund in 1970, but they were divorced in the late-1970s. Their daughter, Michele Matheson, is an actress and novelist. Matheson was later married to actress Maxine Arnold. He died on June 29, 2014, in Woodland Hills, Los Angeles from lung cancer, aged 84.

Filmography

Film

Television

References

External links

Notice of death

1929 births
2014 deaths
American male television actors
American municipal police officers
Male actors from Michigan
Deaths from lung cancer in California